Karlova Ves is a borough in the city of Bratislava, the capital of Slovakia. It is located in the western part of the city close to the river Danube on the slopes of the Little Carpathians mountains and it is part of the Bratislava IV administrative district. A small, wine-making village for most of its history it was assimilated into Bratislava in the 1940s and in 1957, the construction of a large socialist panelák suburb started. Today, Karlova Ves has approximately 33,000 inhabitants and university dormitories in Mlynská dolina house an additional 15,000 students at the total area of 7874 meters squared.

Karlova Ves consists of three distinct parts: Dlhé diely suburb which houses most of the inhabitants, Mlynská dolina area which features some of the city's central institutions including universities, the Bratislava Zoo and Botanical Garden of the Comenius University. The Karlova Ves proper includes also the largest island in Bratislava; Sihoť. The city part also features the Bratislava Water Museum, the Slávičie údolie cemetery, numerous schools and three Roman-Catholic churches. The St. Francis Square serves as the center of the city borough.

Location 
Karlova Ves borders Austria and Petržalka to the south, Devín to the west, Dúbravka to the north and Old Town to the east. The southern boundary is the river Danube. The original village lied on the western slopes of the Bratislava Foothills, the southernmost part of the Devín Carpathians mountain range, in the valley of the Karloveský stream, on both of its sides. The altitude difference is from 134 meters AMSL at the Karloveská bay to 264 m AMSL at the mountain Nad Sitinou, mean altitude in the borough is 165 meters AMSL.

In the past, the boundaries of Karlova Ves used to change often, stabilizing in their current place after 1971. The southern boundary is the Petržalka bank of the Danube, border with Austria and the Karloveské rameno creating island Sihoť. Eastern boundary is the Cesta na Červený most Street, Lamačská cesta Street, Mlynská dolina street until the river Danube, running underneath the Lafranconi bridge. The northern boundary runs around various industrial buildings until reaching Polianky street, then the gas station at Lamačská cesta Street, then Zelenohorská Street and the northern side of the Bratislava - Malacky railway tracks. The western boundary runs west of Dlhé diely, through the western part of Kuklovská Street, Sološnícka Street, Šaštínska Street, Hrubý vrch, Krčace and finally a forest road at Sitina.

Division 
Karlova Ves is divided into five local parts: Dlhé diely, Mlynská dolina, Kútiky, Rovnice and island Sihoť. Cadastrially it is divided into 9 sectors: Karlova Ves, Dlhé diely, Líščie údolie, Krčace, Patrónka, Mlynská dolina, Sitina - ZOO, Karloveská zátoka (Karlova Ves Bay) and Sihoť.

History 
Archeological finds of stone tools date human settlement of this area to the Lower Paleolithic. A settlement pit containing the ritual burial of a child with an adult's skull dating from the year 5,000 BCE was discovered in the area above the Bratislava Botanical Garden. It is the oldest human remains ever discovered in the Bratislava area.

In the 20th century, Karlova Ves was a small vineyard village in the proximity of Bratislava, and was incorporated into the city in 1943. It includes large, recent high-rise apartment blocks in the Dlhé diely area. In the Mlynská dolina quarter is the headquarters of Slovak Television, and there is Slávičie údolie cemetery nearby.

Politics 
List of Mayors of Karlova Ves and political parties that nominated them:
 1991 – 1994 – Jozef Krištúfek
 1994 – 1998 – Bystrík Hollý (KDH, NDS, DÚ, SPŽ SR)
 1998 – 2002 – Bystrík Hollý (KDH, DÚ, DS, SDSS, SZS)
 2002 – 2006 – Bystrík Hollý (DS, DÚ, KDH, SZS), other sources claim (SDKÚ-DS, KDH)
 2006 – 2010 – Iveta Hanulíková (SMER, HZDS, SNS)
 2010 – 2014 – Iveta Hanulíková (SMER)
 2014 – 2022 – Dana Čahojová (independent)

Religion 

Karlova Ves features three Roman-Catholic churches:
 Church of the Nativity of Mary - consecrated in 1995
 Church of Saint Michael Archangel - built in the 18th century, consecrated in 1935
 Church of Saint Francis of Assisi - consecrated in 2002

Education 

Karlova Ves features 5 high-schools, 4 elementary schools and 11 kindergartens. Mlynská dolina, part of Karlova Ves, features numerous universities and university dormitories.

 High-school equivalent: Gymnázium Ladislava Sáru 1, Škola úžitkového výtvarníctva Josefa Vydru Dúbravská cesta 11, Spojená škola s organizačnými zloţkami: ZŠ a gymnázium Tilgnerova 14, Spojená škola sv. Františka z Assisi s organizačnými zložkami: ZŠ sv. Františka z Assisi a gymnázium sv. Františka z Assisi, Súkromné gymnázium ESPRIT Majerníkova 62
 Elementary schools: ZŠ Karloveská 61, ZŠ Alexandra Dubčeka Majerníkova 62
 Kindergartens: MŠ Adámiho 11, MŠ Borská 4, MŠ Kolískova 14, MŠ Ladislava Sáru 3, MŠ Ľudovíta Fullu 12, MŠ Majerníkova 11, MŠ Majerníkova 60, MŠ Pod Rovnicami 1, MŠ Suchohradská 3, ŠMŠ Svrčia 3 (special needs), SŠ Mokrohájska 3 (special needs)

Sports 
The main sporting club in Karlova Ves is Karloveský športový klub. There are three multi-functional playgrounds available for free to the public: inside the area of School Alexandra Dubčeka, School Karloveská 32 and School Veternicová 20.

Notable people 
 Libor Ebringer, Professor of microbiology and Doctor of Sciences

See also 
 Boroughs and localities of Bratislava
 Geography of Bratislava

References

External links
 Karlova Ves website

Boroughs of Bratislava